Organix is the debut studio album of American hip hop band The Roots, released on May 19, 1993 by the band, independently. It was originally sold at the band's shows in Europe. The album earned enough industry buzz to earn The Roots offers from major record labels, after which they signed with DGC Records, which at the time was better known for its grunge music releases. Organix was re-released in 1998 on Cargo Records.

Track listing

References

Notes

External links 
 Organix at Discogs

1993 debut albums
The Roots albums
Albums produced by Questlove
Albums produced by Scott Storch
Self-released albums